Raoued is a town and commune in the Ariana Governorate, Tunisia. As of 2014 it had a total population of 94,691.

Giant sandstorms wiped across most of the city in 2016.

See also
List of cities in Tunisia

References

External links
 Official Website

Populated places in Ariana Governorate
Communes of Tunisia
Tunisia geography articles needing translation from French Wikipedia